Matthew Charles Jones is professor of international history at the London School of Economics. Jones is a specialist in British foreign and defence policy since the Second World War, British decolonization and South East Asia, the Vietnam War, nuclear history during the Cold War, American foreign relations since 1941 and Anglo-American relations.

Since 2008, Jones has been the British Cabinet Office official historian of the UK strategic nuclear deterrent and the Chevaline programme.

Bibliography

Books
 Britain, the United States and the Mediterranean War, 1942-44. Macmillan, London, 1996.
 Conflict and Confrontation in South East Asia, 1961-1965: Britain, the United States, Indonesia, and the Creation of Malaysia. Cambridge University Press, Cambridge, 2002.
 After Hiroshima: The United States, Race, and Nuclear Weapons in Asia, 1945-1965. Cambridge University Press, Cambridge, 2010.

Critical studies and reviews of Jones' work
The official history of the UK strategic nuclear deterrent

References

External links 
THE REVIEW OF THE GOVERNMENT’S OFFICIAL HISTORY PROGRAMME REPORT.

Academics of the London School of Economics
Alumni of the University of Sussex
Academics of Royal Holloway, University of London
Alumni of St Antony's College, Oxford
Academics of the University of Nottingham
British historians

Living people
Year of birth missing (living people)